The Araucarias Biosphere Reserve is located in the Andes range, in south-central Chile. It comprises the Conguillío National Park and the Alto Bío-Bío National Reserve. The main feature of this Biosphere Reserve is the massive presence of Araucarias .

See also

 List of environment topics
 World Network of Biosphere Reserves

References and external links
 Araucarias Biosphere Reserve
 https://web.archive.org/web/20061107144912/http://www.sernatur.cl/Areas_Silvestres/Araucania/Araucania.html

Biosphere reserves of Chile